Coscinocladium is a genus of two species of lichenized fungi in the family Physciaceae.

Species
Coscinocladium gaditanum  (2004)
Coscinocladium occidentale  (1846)

References

Caliciales
Lichen genera
Caliciales genera
Taxa described in 1846